The fifth season of CSI: NY originally aired on CBS between September 2008 and May 2009. It consisted of 25 episodes. Its regular time slot continued on Wednesdays at 10pm/9c. The premiere, "Veritas", concluded the story from the previous season's cliffhanger finale, "Hostage".

CSI: NY – The Fifth Season was released on DVD in the U.S. on September 29, 2009.

Cast

Main cast
 Gary Sinise as Mac Taylor
 Melina Kanakaredes as Stella Bonasera
 Carmine Giovinazzo as Danny Messer
 Anna Belknap as Lindsay Monroe
 Robert Joy as Sid Hammerback
 A. J. Buckley as Adam Ross
 Hill Harper as Sheldon Hawkes
 Eddie Cahill as Don Flack

Recurring cast
 Emmanuelle Vaugier as Jessica Angell
 Jonah Lotan as Dr. Marty Pino
 Kathleen Munroe as Samantha Flack

Episodes

References

External links

CSI: NY Season 5 Episode List on Internet Movie Database
CSI: NY Season 5 Episode Guide on CSI Files
CSI: New York on CBS on The Futon Critic

2008 American television seasons
2009 American television seasons
05